Custer County is a county in the U.S. state of Nebraska. As of the 2020 United States Census, the population was 10,545. Its county seat is Broken Bow. The county was formed in 1877 and named after General George Armstrong Custer, who was killed at the Battle of Little Bighorn.

In the Nebraska license plate system, Custer County is represented by the prefix 4 (it had the fourth-largest number of vehicles registered in the county when the license plate system was established in 1922).

Geography
In area, it is the second largest county in Nebraska, behind only Cherry County.

Major highways

  U.S. Highway 183
  Nebraska Highway 2
  Nebraska Highway 21
  Nebraska Highway 40
  Nebraska Highway 47
  Nebraska Highway 70
  Nebraska Highway 92

Adjacent counties

 Valley County – northeast
 Sherman County – southeast
 Buffalo County – southeast
 Dawson County – south
 Lincoln County – southwest
 Logan County – west
 Blaine County – northwest
 Loup County – northeast

Demographics

As of the 2000 United States Census, there were 11,793 people, 4,826 households, and 3,320 families in the county. The population density was 5 people per square mile (2/km2). There were 5,585 housing units at an average density of 2 per square mile (1/km2). The racial makeup of the county was 98.63% White, 0.07% Black or African American, 0.41% Native American, 0.15% Asian, 0.20% from other races, and 0.55% from two or more races. 0.92% of the population were Hispanic or Latino of any race. 37.3% were of German, 11.9% English, 10.6% Irish and 8.9% American ancestry.

There were 4,826 households, out of which 30.30% had children under the age of 18 living with them, 60.90% were married couples living together, 5.40% had a female householder with no husband present, and 31.20% were non-families. 28.90% of all households were made up of individuals, and 15.00% had someone living alone who was 65 years of age or older. The average household size was 2.39 and the average family size was 2.95.

The county population contained 26.30% under the age of 18, 5.50% from 18 to 24, 23.50% from 25 to 44, 23.70% from 45 to 64, and 21.10% who were 65 years of age or older. The median age was 41 years. For every 100 females there were 96.10 males. For every 100 females age 18 and over, there were 91.70 males.

The median income for a household in the county was $30,677, and the median income for a family was $37,063. Males had a median income of $24,609 versus $19,732 for females. The per capita income for the county was $16,171. About 9.10% of families and 12.40% of the population were below the poverty line, including 16.20% of those under age 18 and 9.10% of those age 65 or over.

Communities

Cities
 Broken Bow (county seat)
 Sargent

Villages

 Anselmo
 Ansley
 Arnold
 Berwyn
 Callaway
 Comstock
 Mason City
 Merna
 Oconto

Census-designated place
 Westerville

Unincorporated communities

 Cumro
 Etna
 Finchville
 Gates
 Lillian
 Lodi
 Milburn
 New Helena
 Round Valley
 Walworth
 Weissert
 Wescott

Townships

 Algernon
 Ansley
 Arnold
 Berwyn
 Broken Bow
 Cliff
 Comstock
 Corner
 Custer
 Delight
 Douglas Grove
 East Custer
 Elim
 Elk Creek
 Garfield
 Grant
 Hayes
 Kilfoil
 Lillian
 Loup
 Milburn
 Myrtle
 Ryno
 Sargent
 Spring Creek
 Triumph
 Victoria
 Wayne
 Westerville
 West Union
 Wood River

Politics
Custer County voters are reliably Republican. In no national election since 1936 has the county selected the Democratic Party candidate.

See also
 National Register of Historic Places listings in Custer County, Nebraska

References

 
Nebraska counties
1877 establishments in Nebraska
Populated places established in 1877